Algeria  competed at the inaugural African Beach Games in Sal, Cape Verde from 14 to 23 June 2019. In total athletes representing Algeria won five gold medals, six silver medals and five bronze medals. The country finished in 2nd place in the medal table.

Medal summary

Medalists

References 

Nations at the 2019 African Beach Games
African Beach Games